Bingham School is a former elementary school located at 555 South 5th Avenue in Alpena, Michigan. It was listed on the National Register of Historic Places in 2020.

History
The first school in Alpena was constructed in 1863, and a union school followed in 1870. In the 1880s, five small "ward schools" were constructed in neighborhoods to house younger students. As the city grew, these schools became almost immediately overcrowded. More schools were constructed, but despite this the space issue was chronic. The three ward schools on the city's south side, Franklin, Lockwood, and Cass, all remained in use into the 1930s. In 1935, however, the school board authorized the construction of a new building to replace these three.

Joseph C. Goddeyne was hired to provide a plan for the school, which had an estimated cost of $180,000. Fortunately, the WPA covered $81,000 of the cost. Construction began in 1935, and was completed in 1936. The school was named after Moses Bingham, one of the first settlers of Alpena, and the owner of its first hotel and first gristmill. This was the last elementary school built in the city until 1950. The city continued to grow, and student enrollment peaked in 1970 at over 9000 students. However, enrollment declined afterward, and by 1995 there were fewer than 6000 students enrolled' In 2008, there were only about 4500 students enrolled. Alpena Public Schools closed Bingham School in 1982.

After the school closed, it remained vacant for a time. It was sold to a private investor, and in 2004 was reopened as a charter school. The charter school closed in 2015, and the building has been vacant since that time.

Description
Bingham School is two-story red brick Collegiate Gothic structure, laid out in a traditional H plan. The brick exterior is trimmed with light colored limestone detailing. There are two main entrances on the main façade located in two-story projecting bays. The entries are recessed with large segmental arched windows. Between the entry projections are five very large window openings. On either side are three bays with windows in the first and second floor.

On the interior are six classrooms on each floor, three on each side of the hall. The main floor also contains the principal's office, music teacher's office and rest rooms. In the front there is a combined gymnasium and auditorium located between the entrances; the gymnasium extends up to the second floor. The second floor also has classrooms, restrooms, and  library and conference room.

References

External links

National Register of Historic Places in Alpena County, Michigan
School buildings completed in 1936
School buildings on the National Register of Historic Places in Michigan
Schools in Alpena County, Michigan